Tunica Mound is an undersea mound located in the Gulf of Mexico. It is approximately 240 miles southeast of Houston and 200 miles southwest of New Orleans.

References 

Landforms of the Gulf of Mexico